Ho Chi Minh City Museum of Fine Arts is the major art museum of Ho Chi Minh City, Vietnam, and second in the country only to the Vietnam National Museum of Fine Arts in Hanoi.

The museum covers three three-floor buildings which house a collection featuring Vietnamese art works in sculpture, oil, silk painting and lacquer painting, as well as traditional styles including woodcut paintings in the Hàng Trống, Đông Hồ, and Kim Hoàng styles, as well as Vietnamese ceramics and a collection of ancient Buddhist art. The first floor also includes a commercial gallery of art works. Archaeological exhibits such as some of the country's best Champa and Óc Eo relics are displayed on the third floor.

The main building was constructed by a French architect Rivera between 1929 and 1934 as a villa for the Hua (Hui-Bon-Hoa) family. The museum moved there in 1987.

References

Museums in Ho Chi Minh City
Art museums and galleries in Vietnam